Aaron Taylor may refer to:
 Aaron Taylor (American football, born 1972), former NFL player, sports analyst
 Aaron Taylor (American football, born 1975), former college football player for the University of Nebraska
 Aaron Taylor (baseball) (born 1977), former Major League Baseball player
 Aaron Taylor (footballer) (born 1990), English professional footballer

See also
 Aaron Taylor-Sinclair (born 1991), Scottish professional footballer
 Aaron Taylor-Johnson (born 1990), English actor
 Erin Taylor (born 1987), New Zealand sprint canoeist
 Erin Taylor-Talcott (born 1978), American racewalker